Radio e Televisão de Timor-Leste, E.P. (RTTL, Radio and Television of East Timor in English) is the national radio and television broadcaster in East Timor.

Radio
The radio branch of RTTL is known as Radio Timor Leste (RTL), which broadcasts in Tetum and Portuguese. Radio Timor Leste is broadcast 16 hours a day with 34 programs locally produced by a staff of 63. Seven percent of RTL's programmes come from outside producers, including non governmental organizations and agencies.

RTL has 4 departments to support its daily operation: News, Programming, Technical, and the Department of Promotion, External Production and Research.

RTL Director Mr Rosario Da Graca Maia also serves as the Head of International Relations of Timor Lorosae'e Journalist's Association - TLJA. He has received an Australian Leadership Award and he's the Young International Analyst and Alert coordinator for the Southeast Asia Press Alliance - SEAPA

Radio Timor Leste can be reached on FM frequency in Dili 91.7 and different frequency in every District. RTL has AM frequency on 684. RTL has a plan to open up a new Channel called Antena 2 targeted youth and possibility to attend advertisement as the institution base on decree law 48/2008 became as empresa publica (public company).

Base on the survey done by East Timor Insight, Radio Timor Leste as a major channel of information and has a widest coverage of the population.

Television
The television division of RTTL is known as Televisão de Timor Leste or Televizaun Timor Lorosae (East Timor Television), abbreviated as TVTL. Its schedule consists of some locally made programs in Tetum, as well as relay of news programmes and others from RTP Internacional. In the past it occasionally broadcast a few programmes from ABC's Australia Network, and BBC World News. In September 2008, it signed an agreement with Brazil's Rede Globo, allowing its access to that channel's programming.

TVTL began broadcast in 1978, first as the East Timor station of TVRI and was later renamed as TV UNTAET. Following independence on 20 May 2002, it adopted its present name.

See also
 Communications in East Timor

References

External links
 Radio-Televisão Timor Leste

Mass media in East Timor
Radio stations in East Timor
Television stations in East Timor
Multilingual broadcasters
Portuguese-language radio stations
Portuguese-language television networks
Indonesian-language radio stations
Indonesian-language television networks
Television channels and stations established in 2002
2002 establishments in East Timor
Tetum language